Manabendra Narayan Larma (September 15, 1939 - November 10, 1983), also known as M.N. Larma, was a Jumma Chakma politician and Member of Parliament of Bangladesh. A leading proponent of the rights of the people of the Chittagong Hill Tracts, he was the founding leader of the Parbatya Chattagram Jana Samhati Samiti (United People's Party of the Chittagong Hill Tracts) and its armed wing, the Shanti Bahini.

Early life
Manabendra Narayan Larma was born on 15 September 1939 at Maorum (Mahapuram) village, which is now drowned under the Kaptai Lake of Kaptai Dam. He belonged to the Chakma tribe, which inhabits the Chittagong Hill Tracts of Bangladesh and the neighbouring Indian states of Mizoram and Tripura. He graduated in 1963 from the Government College in Chittagong, completed his Bachelor of Education  degree in 1968 from the Comilla Teachers' Training College and law degree in 1970 from the Chittagong Law College. Larma began working as a lawyer in the Chittagong District of East Pakistan. He became active in politics as a student, helping to organise a Hill Tracts students conference in 1963 and working for the rights of proper compensation of the people of the Hill Tracts displaced by the Kaptai Hydroelectric Project and uprooted from their homestead and villages. He was arrested on February 10, 1963 under the East Pakistan Public Security Ordinance by police. He was released after two years of incarceration on March 8, 1965.

Political career
After his release, Larma worked to unite and politically organise the various ethnic groups and tribes of the Chittagong Hill Tracts. In the 1970 elections, he was elected to the East Pakistan Provincial Assembly as an independent candidate. After the creation of Bangladesh, Larma sought the recognition of the rights of the people of the Hill Tracts and regional autonomy. He was the lone representative of the Chittagong Hill Tracts in the inaugural national legislature. He opposed the drafted Constitution of Bangladesh, which made official the primacy of Bengali culture and did not recognise the non-Bengali ethnic groups and tribal communities living in Bangladesh. Larma's demands were rejected by the country's founding leader Sheikh Mujibur Rahman, who reportedly said that the tribal peoples should adopt Bengali culture and identity and threatened to forcibly settle Bengalis in the Hill Tracts and convert the local people into a minority in their own province. Larma continued to fight for the rights of the indigenous people and is quoted as saying:

Shanti Bahini

On February 15, 1972 Larma founded the Parbatya Chattagram Jana Samhati Samiti (PCJSS), seeking to build an organisation representing all the Jumma Peoples of the Hill Tracts. Larma was elected to the Jatiya Sangsad, the national legislature of Bangladesh as candidate of the PCJSS in 1973. When Larma's continued efforts to make the state recognise the rights of the Jumma peoples failed, Larma and the PCJSS began organising the Shanti Bahini (Peace Corps), an armed force operating in the Hill Tracts area, which began attacking state forces in 1977.
 Being the main leader of the PCJSS and the Shanti Bahini, Larma consequently went underground, into hiding from state security forces. However, factionalism within the PCJSS weakened Larma's standing and he was assassinated on November 10, 1983.

References

Chakma people
People from Chittagong
Parbatya Chattagram Jana Samhati Samiti politicians
1941 births
1983 deaths
Bangladeshi Buddhists
Chittagong Hill Tracts conflict
History of Chittagong Division
Chittagong College alumni
1st Jatiya Sangsad members